The 2023 Conference USA football season will be the 28th season of college football play for Conference USA (C-USA). The season will begin on August 26, 2023, and conclude with the Conference Championship Game on December 2, 2023. The conference will consist of nine members and will be part of the 2023 NCAA Division I FBS football season.

Previous season

During the 2022 season, the UTSA Roadrunners posted the best record in the regular season. UTSA and North Texas advanced to the championship game, where UTSA won by a score of 48–27.

Conference realignment
Prior to the 2023 season, Conference USA saw substantial realignment, with six schools leaving the conference to join the American Athletic Conference: UTSA, North Texas, Charlotte, Florida Atlantic, Rice, and UAB. Conference USA then invited four schools to join: Liberty and New Mexico State, who were both previously FBS independents; Jacksonville State, who were previously in the ASUN Conference at the NCAA Division I FCS level; and Sam Houston, who were previously in the Western Athletic Conference also at the Division I FCS level. The realignment left C-USA with nine football members for the 2023 season. C-USA further announced that Kennesaw State, another member of the ASUN Conference, would move up beginning in 2024.

Both Jacksonville State and Sam Houston are ineligible for both the conference championship and for bowl games due to their transition from the FCS level to FBS level.

Head Coaches
On December 4, 2022, Jamey Chadwell was announced as the new head coach of Liberty after previous head coach Hugh Freeze left to take the head coaching position at Auburn. Chadwell had previously been head coach of Coastal Carolina in the Sun Belt Conference.

Note: All stats shown are before the start of the 2023 season.

Rankings

Schedule

The 2023 schedule was released on January 10, 2023.

All times Eastern time.

Week 0

Week 1

Week 2

Week 3

Week 4

Week 5

Week 6

Week 7

Week 8

Week 9

Week 10

Week 11

Week 12

Week 13

Conference USA Championship Game

Conference USA records vs other conferences

2023–2024 records against non-conference foes:

Conference USA vs Power 5 matchups
This is a list of games C-USA has scheduled versus power conference teams (ACC, Big 10, Big 12, Pac-12, Notre Dame and SEC). All rankings are from the current AP Poll at the time of the game.

Conference USA vs Group of Five matchups
The following games include C-USA teams competing against teams from the American, MAC, Mountain West, or Sun Belt.

Conference USA vs FBS independents matchups
The following games include C-USA teams competing against FBS Independents, which includes Army, UConn, or UMass.

Conference USA vs FCS matchups

Awards and honors

Player of the week honors

References

2023 Conference USA football season